In mathematics, the no-wandering-domain theorem is a result on dynamical systems, proven by Dennis Sullivan in 1985.

The theorem states that a rational map f : Ĉ → Ĉ with deg(f) ≥ 2 does not have a wandering domain, where Ĉ denotes the Riemann sphere.   More precisely, for every component U in the Fatou set of f,  the sequence

will eventually become periodic.  Here, f n denotes the n-fold iteration of f, that is,

The theorem does not hold for arbitrary maps; for example, the transcendental map  has wandering domains. However, the result can be generalized to many situations where the functions naturally belong to a finite-dimensional parameter space, most notably to transcendental entire and meromorphic functions with a finite number of singular values.

References
 Lennart Carleson and Theodore W. Gamelin, Complex Dynamics, Universitext: Tracts in Mathematics, Springer-Verlag, New York, 1993,   
 Dennis Sullivan, Quasiconformal homeomorphisms and dynamics. I. Solution of the Fatou-Julia problem on wandering domains, Annals of Mathematics 122 (1985), no. 3, 401–18.  
 S. Zakeri, Sullivan's proof of Fatou's no wandering domain conjecture

Ergodic theory
Limit sets
Theorems in dynamical systems
Complex dynamics